Aloe camperi is a species of aloe indigenous to Africa, specifically the regions of Ethiopia and Eritrea.

It grows in colonies, with orange flowers in early spring.

External links

 Desert-tropicals.com profile

camperi
Flora of Northeast Tropical Africa